The Ferlo Sud Wildlife Reserve, established in 1972, is a  IUCN habitat and species protected nature reserve located in Senegal.  The nature reserve is bordered by the Ferlo Nord Wildlife Reserve to the north.

References

Protected areas of Senegal
Protected areas established in 1972